Mato Grosso Arára (also disambiguated as Arara do Beiradão or Arara do Rio Branco, and also known as Koaiá ~ Koayá or Yugapkatã) is an extinct unclassified language of Brazil. The ethnic population that spoke the language numbers about 150.

Classification
The language is unclassified, with no known connections to established families. It is attested in a single word list, which shows it is neither Tupian nor Arawakan. Four people remembered the language in 2001, and two in 2008, but none were fluent speakers.

Jolkesky (2010) notes some lexical similarities with Tupian.

Vocabulary 

The following vocabulary list was collected in 2011 by Inês Hargreaves from two Arara groups in the north of the Parque Aripuanã, Rondônia. The informants were João Luis V. Arara, José Rodrigues V. Arara, Maria Aruy Arara, and Ana Anita Arara.

For a more extensive vocabulary list of Arara by Jolkesky (2010),  see the corresponding Portuguese article.

References

External links

Unclassified languages of South America
Extinct languages of South America
Mamoré–Guaporé linguistic area